Timothy Kelbert (born October 30, 1959) is a sailor from the United States Virgin Islands, who represented his country at the 1976 Summer Olympics in Kingston, Ontario, Canada as crew member in the Soling. With helmsman Dick Johnson and fellow crew member Doug Graham they took the 24th place.

Sources

External links
 
 
 

1959 births
Living people
United States Virgin Islands male sailors (sport)
Olympic sailors of the United States Virgin Islands
Sailors at the 1976 Summer Olympics – Soling